

This is a list of the National Register of Historic Places listings in Hamilton County, Tennessee.

This is intended to be a complete list of the properties and districts on the National Register of Historic Places in Hamilton County, Tennessee, United States. Latitude and longitude coordinates are provided for many National Register properties and districts; these locations may be seen together in a map.

There are 108 properties and districts listed on the National Register in the county, including one National Historic Landmark, the Moccasin Bend Archeological District.  Another 7 properties were once listed but have been removed.

Current listings

|}

Former listings

|}

See also

 List of National Historic Landmarks in Tennessee
 National Register of Historic Places listings in Tennessee

References

Hamilton